A naked butler is a popular type of entertainment used at hen parties and for corporate entertainment. It was introduced into the UK in the early 2000s and is now popular across the USA, New Zealand, Australia and Canada.

Attire

Naked butler

The standard attire for a naked butler is only an apron or trunks, cuffs, detachable collar and bow tie. It is seen as a more conservative entertainment option to hiring a male stripper for a Bachelorette party as it can be suitable for a broader range of guests.

Topless waiter

In this case the apron will be replaced with smart black trousers. This option may be more commonly used during corporate entertainment where the attire needs to be smarter and the exposing of a butler's naked bottom is not appropriate.

In popular culture
Naked butlers have become a popular gimmick on television shows in the UK and this is demonstrated by appearances on TV shows including Deal or No Deal, Come Dine with Me and the X Factor. In February 2005, the role and job of a naked butler was discussed in the documentary Going to work Naked on ITV. In 2018, naked butlers were part of an international news feature after being hired by a retirement home as part of the resident's wish program.

References

2000s fads and trends
Erotic parties
Women in society
Pre-wedding
Entertainment